The 1954/55 NTFL season was the 34th season of the Northern Territory Football League (NTFL).

St Marys have won there 1st premiership title while defeating the Buffaloes in the grand final by 30 points.

Grand Final

References 

Northern Territory Football League seasons
NTFL